The intermediate station Molinos is part of the TransMilenio mass-transit system of Bogotá, Colombia, opened in the year 2000.

Location
The station is located in southern Bogotá, specifically on Avenida Caracas with Carrera 9 and Calle 51 sur.

It serves the Molinos del Sur and Molinos de la Caracas. With feeder service, it also serves the La Picota and Diana Turbay neighborhoods.

History
At the beginning of 2001, the second phase of the Caracas line of the system was opened from Tercer Milenio to the intermediate station Calle 40 Sur. A few months later, service was extended south to Portal de Usme.

The station is named Molinos due to its proximity to the Molinos del Sur and Molinos de la Caracas neighborhoods.

Station Services

Old trunk services

Current Trunk Services

Feeder routes
The station connects with the following feeder routes:

 Bochica loop
 Diana Turbay loop
 Molinos loop

Inter-city service
This station does not have inter-city service.

See also
Bogotá
TransMilenio
List of TransMilenio Stations

TransMilenio
2001 establishments in Colombia